The Gurez National Park, also known as Musk Deer National Park, is one of the protected areas of Pakistan. It is located in Neelum District in Azad kashmir, Pakistan, besides the Neelum River in the Gurez valley. It is located in the high Himalayas and Pir Panjal Range. It is a thirty-five minute drive from Gurez tehsil. It is also known as Gurez valley national park.

Location 
The Gurez national park is located in Neelum District, and consists of the easternmost portion of the district, amounting to 14.5% of its territory. It is a thirty minute drive from Neelum town. It is nestles among the Pir Panjal Range and the Lower Himalayan Range in the Himalayan foothills.

Geography 
The park is located in the high Himalayan foothills of north-western. There are rugged mountain tracts rising up to an elevation of 3,000m above sea level. The average elevation mainly ranges from 1,500-3,000m. Natural freshwater streams feed the Neelum River, which runs across the Gurez valley. It was notified as a national park in 2007, and is managed by the Himalayan Wildlife Foundation.

Flora 
The habitat here consists entirely of Western Himalayan subalpine conifer forests, covered mainly by trees such as Blue pine, deodar and Betula utilis, Picea smithiana, Abies pindrow along with some of the last stands of the endangered Taxus wallichiana or Himalayan yew. Common flowering plants include Rosa moschata and herbs and grasses such as Skimmia laureola and Sinopodophyllum which make up the flora of the lower slopes.

Fauna 
The national park was established to protect the endangered musk deer. In total it is home to some 19 mammals, 100 birds and a few reptiles. The Himalayan musk deer is found here and the total population could possibly cross 50 individuals.
Major mammal species of the park include:
Indian leopard, Panthera pardus millardi
Snow leopard, Panthera uncia
Leopard cat, Prionaillurus bengalensis bengalensis
Himalayan brown bear, Ursus arctos isabellinus
Himalayan black bear, Ursus thibetanus laniger
Himalayan wolf, Canis lupus chanco
Yellow-throated marten, Martes flavigula flavigula
Beech marten, Martes foina
Red giant flying squirrel, Petaurista petaurista albiventer
Long-tailed marmot, Marmota caudata aurea
Kashmir stag, Cervus elaphus hanglu
Himalayan musk deer, Moschus leucogaster
Kashmir musk deer, Moschus cupreus

Birds of the park include:
Himalayan snowcock, Tetrrogallus himalayensis
Himalayan monal, Lophophorus imejanus
Koklass pheasant, Pucrasia malphora
Himalayan vulture, Gyps himlayensis

Reptiles include Laudakia agrorensis and Laudakia tuberculata.

References 

National parks of Pakistan
Protected areas of Azad Kashmir